The Year of the Yao is a 2004 American documentary film based on basketball player Yao Ming's first year in the United States. The film is narrated by his friend and former interpreter Colin Pine, who stayed with Yao during Yao's rookie year, and interpreted for him for three years.

The film made its world premiere at the Toronto International Film Festival on September 16, 2004, and was theatrically released by Fine Line Features in the United States on April 15, 2005. The film received generally positive reviews from critics.

Reception

Box office 
The Year of the Yao had a limited theatrical release in the United States, Australia and Taiwan. The film grossed $38,585 during its theatrical run.

Critical reception 
On Rotten Tomatoes, the film has an approval rating of 67% based on 33 reviews, with an average rating of 6.30/10. The site's critical consensus reads, "This sports bio documentary is given a few fresh angles, including culture clash issues, and the friendship that develops between Yao and his interpreter." On Metacritic, the film has a score of 62 out of 100 based on 11 critics, indicating "generally favorable reviews."

References

External links
Official site

2004 films
2000s English-language films
2000s Mandarin-language films
Films scored by James L. Venable
Documentary films about sportspeople
Documentary films about basketball
American basketball films
Houston Rockets
Films shot in Houston
Films directed by Adam Del Deo and James D. Stern
2000s American films